Daniel Morgan House, also known as the George Flowerdew Norton House, Boyd House, and Sherrard House, is a historic home located at Winchester, Virginia. It is a -story, seven bay, 17 room, Late Georgian style brick dwelling. It has a side-gable roof and paired double interior chimneys. The oldest section was built about 1786 for George Flowerdew Norton, and the western stuccoed brick wing was built for Daniel Morgan (1736–1802) about 1800. A brick kitchen, built about 1820 is attached to the north side of the dwelling and two-story addition, constructed about 1885, is attached to the northwest corner of the house. A one-room addition was added to the eastern side about 1890, and a second-story room was built above the back porch about 1915. Also on the property is a contributing coursed stone retaining wall (c. 1900).

It was added to the National Register of Historic Places in 2013. It is located in the Winchester Historic District.

Gen.Daniel Morgan died in this house on July 6, 1802. The house then was the home of his daughter.

References

External links
 

Houses on the National Register of Historic Places in Virginia
Georgian architecture in Virginia
Houses completed in 1786
Houses in Winchester, Virginia
National Register of Historic Places in Winchester, Virginia
Individually listed contributing properties to historic districts on the National Register in Virginia